The Power Line Trail is a multi-use trail located in Horsham Township, Montgomery County, Pennsylvania. It follows a PECO Energy right-of-way through the township.

History and features
In 2007, PECO Energy provided a $10,000 grant to Horsham Township to pay for half of the estimated $20,000 cost to build two trails that would connect the Power Line Trail to the township's Simmons Elementary School and a library located nearby.

The trail is planned to extend west into Montgomery and Upper Gwynedd townships to connect to the US 202 Parkway Trail and east into Upper Moreland Township to connect to the Pennypack Trail and Cross County Trail.

References

Bike paths in Pennsylvania
Protected areas of Montgomery County, Pennsylvania